Torkan (also Romanized as Torkān; also known as Arāvjūn, Barakān Herābarjān, Torkān-e-Harābarjān, Torkān-e Herābarjān, Torkūn, Towrkān, and Turkān) is a village in Harabarjan Rural District of the Central District of Marvast County, Yazd province, Iran. At the 2006 National Census, its population was 969 in 274 households, when it was in Marvast District of Khatam County. The following census in 2011 counted 1,136 people in 298 households. The latest census in 2016 showed a population of 1,332 people in 429 households; it was the largest village in its rural district. After the census, Marvast District was raised to county status and split into two districts.

References 

Populated places in Yazd Province